This is a list of diplomatic missions of Mauritius, excluding honorary consulates. Mauritius has a small presence worldwide.

Africa

 Cairo (Embassy)

 Addis Ababa (Embassy)

 Antananarivo (Embassy)

 Maputo (High Commission)

 Pretoria (High Commission)

America

 Washington, D.C. (Embassy)

Asia

 Beijing (Embassy)

 New Delhi (High Commission)
 Mumbai (Consulate)

 Kuala Lumpur (High Commission)

 Islamabad (High Commission)

 Riyadh (Embassy)

 Dubai (Consulate-General)

Europe

 Brussels (Embassy)

 Paris (Embassy)

 Berlin (Embassy)

 Moscow (Embassy)

 Geneva (Embassy)

 London (High Commission)

Oceania

 Canberra (High Commission)

Multilateral organizations
 African Union
Addis Ababa (Permanent Mission to the African Union)

Brussels (Mission to the European Union)

Geneva (Permanent Mission to the United Nations and international organizations)
New York (Permanent Mission to the United Nations)

Paris (Permanent Mission to UNESCO)

Gallery

See also
 Foreign relations of Mauritius
 List of diplomatic missions in Mauritius
 Visa policy of Mauritius

References

Ministry of Foreign Affairs, Regional Integration and International Trade of Mauritius

 
Diplomatic missions
Mauritius
Diplomatic missions